Ilkabere is a settlement in Kenya's Garissa County.  It is very close to the Somali border.

References 

Populated places in North Eastern Province (Kenya)
Garissa County